"Come Back To Me Baby" is a song by German–American boy band US5. It was written by Dashiel Andrews, MM Dollar, Mike Michaels, Sammy Naja, and Jay "TK-Roxx" Khan for the reissue of their debut studio album Here We Go (2005). Production was helmed by Dollar, Michaels, and Naja. The song peaked at number three on the German Singles Chart and reached number four in Austria and Switzerland, respectively.

Track listings

Notes
 denotes additional producer

Charts

Weekly charts

Year-end charts

References

2006 singles
US5 songs
2006 songs